Doggone Tired is a 1949 cartoon short directed by Tex Avery. Doggone Tired is one of three MGM cartoons currently in the public domain in the United States.

Plot

Speedy the dog is brought to a cabin in the woods by his owner to hunt rabbits. Despite his eagerness, Speedy is told to go to sleep by his owner. Overhearing the owner state that Speedy needs sleep, the rabbit harasses Speedy throughout the night to keep him awake. Despite Speedy stopping each plot by the rabbit, he continues to not get sleep. After keeping Speedy up all night, the rabbit also is tired in the morning. Speedy's owner attempts to get him to hunt the rabbit, but Speedy is unable to due to his tiredness. In the end, Speedy and the rabbit both end up sleeping in the rabbit's nest.

Voice cast
Tex Avery, William Hanna and Billy Bletcher as Speedy Dog
Tex Avery as Rabbit
Patrick McGeehan as Hunter
Sara Berner as Operator

Release
The short was played in front of various different films during its initial release including The Red Danube and Come to the Stable. During its 1956 re-release, the short played in front of Ransom! and The Swan. As part of the public domain, the short can easily be found online and in various collections including the Tex Avery Screwball Classics Volume 2.

References

External links

1949 animated films
1949 short films
1949 films
1940s American animated films
1940s animated short films
Films directed by Tex Avery
Films produced by Fred Quimby
Films scored by Scott Bradley
Metro-Goldwyn-Mayer animated short films
Animated films about dogs
Animated films about rabbits and hares
Films about hunters
Public domain